Gordon Edwin Dirks  (born June 22, 1947) is a Canadian educator and politician, who has held political office in the provinces of Saskatchewan and Alberta.

Life and career
Dirks was born in Saskatoon in 1947, and studied at the University of Saskatchewan, receiving a BEd degree. Dirks went on to earn a diploma in educational administration and a MEd from the University of Regina and continued his studies at the Canadian Bible College and Theological Seminary in Regina. He taught school, served as public school principal and was registrar for the Canadian Bible College from 1979 to 1982. In 1971, he married Evangeline Joy Reid.

Dirks represented Regina Rosemont from 1982 to 1986 in the Legislative Assembly of Saskatchewan as a Progressive Conservative member. Dirks served in the Saskatchewan cabinet as Minister of Social Services and as Minister of Urban Affairs. He was defeated by Robert Lyons when he ran for reelection to the assembly in 1986.

From 1986 to 1990, he served as vice-president for the Canadian Bible College, which relocated to Calgary in 2000 as Alliance University College, later becoming Ambrose University College (AUC) as the result of a merger. Dirks was a mayoral candidate in Regina's municipal election in 1988, which was won by Doug Archer. In 1990, Dirks became assistant deputy minister for corporate services with the Alberta Ministry of Family and Social Services, moving to Edmonton. From 1993 to 1996, he served as executive administrator for Beulah Alliance Church in Edmonton and between 1996 and 2006, Dirks served as president of Rocky Mountain College in Calgary.

In 1999, Dirks was elected as trustee for Wards 1 and 2 on the Calgary Board of Education. in a by-election, following the dismissal of the Board by then-Education Minister Lyle Oberg. Dirks ran on a platform to streamline administrative costs provide more support for teachers and ensure reasonable local school fees. In 2000, as a staunch supporter of diversity and parental choice in the public education system, Dirks put forward a motion to accept plans for alternative schools within the CBE. The alternative program policy passed in June 2001. In October 2002, Dirks became chair of the CBE, serving four terms until he retired in 2010.

In 2006, Dirks rejoined AUC as its vice-president of external relations, a position he held until 2010. Between 2010 and 2014 Dirks was the executive pastor of the Centre Street Church in Calgary.

On September 15, 2014, he was appointed to the cabinet of Alberta premier Jim Prentice as Minister of Education, despite not holding a seat in the Legislative Assembly of Alberta. He was subsequently named as the party's candidate in a by-election in Calgary-Elbow, the seat formerly held by Alison Redford. The by-election was scheduled for October 27, 2014, and Dirks won the by-election.

As chairman of the Council of Ministers of Education, Canada, an ex-officio post he inherited along with the political post, Dirks championed the Pan-Canadian Assessment Program, a test of more than 32,000 Grade 8 students from across the country in 2013.

Shortly after Dirks' appointment, concerns were raised regarding Dirks's religious views and how they may impact LGBTQ students in Alberta because of his previous role as executive pastor at Calgary's Centre Street Church. The church's statement of theological principles and ministry practices states that the church believes "God is dishonoured by ... sexual activity between persons of the same sex." However, in a written statement to counter concerns, Dirks writes: "I believe everyone has the right to be respected and treated with honour and dignity … I am committed to ensuring every child in Alberta’s schools has a safe, caring and respectful learning environment."

Dirks was defeated in the 2015 provincial election by Greg Clark of the Alberta Party.

Electoral record

References

External links 
 
Saskatchewan Archives

1947 births
Alberta school board trustees
20th-century Canadian Protestant theologians
Education ministers of Alberta
Living people
Members of the Executive Council of Alberta
Members of the Executive Council of Saskatchewan
Politicians from Calgary
Politicians from Regina, Saskatchewan
Politicians from Saskatoon
Progressive Conservative Party of Saskatchewan MLAs
Progressive Conservative Association of Alberta MLAs
20th-century Canadian politicians
21st-century Canadian politicians
University of Regina alumni
University of Saskatchewan alumni